Anolis placidus, also known as the Neiba twig anole or placid anole, is a species of lizard in the family Dactyloidae. The species is found in the Dominican Republic.

References

Anoles
Reptiles described in 1989
Endemic fauna of the Dominican Republic
Reptiles of the Dominican Republic
Taxa named by Stephen Blair Hedges
Taxa named by Richard Thomas (herpetologist)